Terrantez (also known as Cascal) is a white Portuguese wine grape variety that was once widely used on the island of Madeira to make the sweet fortified wine for which the island is known. Today, the variety is nearly extinct on the island. There are still some limited plantings in the Minho Province where, as Cascal, is a permitted blending variety with Alvarinho and other grapes in the Denominação de Origem Controlada (DOC) wine Vinho Verde. As Terrantez the grape is permitted in several of the  Indicação de Proveniencia Regulamentada (IPR) regions of the Azores including Biscoitos IPR on Terceira Island, Graciosa IPR on the white island of Graciosa and Pico IPR on Pico Island.

Regions

Terrantez is a low yielding vine that is most widely associated with the wines of Madeira though its use in the wine and presence on the island has been slowly fading. Some plantings of the variety can still be found in the Azores, the Portuguese island chain located northwest of Madeira in the Northern Atlantic Ocean. There is also some plantings of in the Minho province on the Portuguese mainland though ampelographer Paul Truel has speculated that the mainland variety (known most often as Cascal) may actually be a different variety, though this has not been conclusively determined.

Wine styles
Terrantez has the potential to make rich full-bodied wines with highly perfumed bouquet. According to wine expert Oz Clarke, in older bottles of Madeira Terrantez has shown an ability to age well in developing wines with long finishes and layers of complexity.

Synonyms and other varieties
In addition to Cascal, Terrantez has been known under a variety of a synonyms including: Morrao, Murrao, Pe de Perdiz, Pe de Perdrix, Pied de Perdix and Terrantes.

Several other white Portuguese grape varieties share synonyms with Terrantez and may be related though there is not yet any conclusive evidence. These include Folgasao which has the synonyms of Terrantez da Madeira and Terrantez de Madere and Donzelinho Branco which has the synonym of Terrantez and Terrantes. 

The Portuguese red grape Alicante Bouschet also shares the Pe de Perdiz synonym with Terrantez and the French/Argentine grape Malbec is also known as Pied de Perdix.

References

White wine grape varieties